Prophasiopsis is a genus of parasitic flies in the family Tachinidae. There are at least two described species in Prophasiopsis.

Species
These two species belong to the genus Prophasiopsis:
 Prophasiopsis lopesi Guimaraes, 1966
 Prophasiopsis polita Townsend, 1927

References

Further reading

 
 
 
 

Tachinidae
Articles created by Qbugbot